Aircraft equipped with contra-rotating propellers, also referred to as CRP, coaxial contra-rotating propellers, or high-speed propellers, apply the maximum power of usually a single piston or turboprop engine to drive a pair of coaxial propellers in contra-rotation. Two propellers are arranged one behind the other, and power is transferred from the engine via a planetary gear or spur gear transmission. Contra-rotating propellers are also known as counter-rotating propellers, although counter-rotating propellers is much more widely used when referring to airscrews on separate non-coaxial shafts turning in opposite directions.

Operation
When airspeed is low, the mass of the air flowing through the propeller disk (thrust) causes a significant amount of tangential or rotational air flow to be created by the spinning blades. The energy of this tangential air flow is wasted in a single-propeller design, and causes handling problems at low speed as the air strikes the vertical stabilizer, causing the aircraft to yaw left or right, depending on the direction of propeller rotation. To use this wasted effort, the placement of a second propeller behind the first takes advantage of the disturbed airflow.

A well designed contra-rotating propeller will have no rotational air flow, pushing a maximum amount of air uniformly through the propeller disk, resulting in high performance and low induced energy loss. It also serves to counter the asymmetrical torque effect of a conventional propeller (see P-factor). Some contra-rotating systems were designed to be used at takeoff for maximum power and efficiency under such conditions, and allowing one of the propellers to be disabled during cruise to extend flight time.

Advantages and disadvantages

The torque on the aircraft from a pair of contra-rotating propellers effectively cancels out.

Contra-rotating propellers have been found to be between 6% and 16% more efficient than normal propellers.

However they can be very noisy, with increases in noise in the axial (forward and aft) direction of up to 30 dB, and tangentially 10 dB. Most of this extra noise can be found in the higher frequencies. These substantial noise problems limit commercial applications. One possibility is to enclose the contra-rotating propellers in a shroud. It is also helpful if the tip speed or the loading of the blades is reduced, if the aft propeller has fewer blades or a smaller diameter than the fore propeller, or if the spacing between the aft and fore propellers is increased.

The efficiency of a contra-rotating propeller is somewhat offset by its mechanical complexity and the added weight of this gearing that makes the aircraft heavier, thus some performance is sacrificed to carry it. Nonetheless, coaxial contra-rotating propellers and rotors have been used in several military aircraft, such as the Tupolev Tu-95 "Bear".

They are also being examined for use in airliners.

Use in aircraft
While several nations experimented with contra-rotating propellers in aircraft, only the United Kingdom and Soviet Union produced them in large numbers. The first aircraft to be fitted with a contra-rotating propeller to fly was in the US when two inventors from Ft Worth, Texas tested the concept on an aircraft.

United Kingdom

A contra-rotating propeller was patented by F. W. Lanchester in 1907.

Some of the more successful British aircraft with contra-rotating propellers are the Avro Shackleton, powered by the Rolls-Royce Griffon engine, and the Fairey Gannet, which used the Double Mamba Mk.101 engine. In the Double Mamba two separate power sections drove one propeller each, allowing one power section (engine) to be shut down in flight, increasing endurance.

Another naval aircraft, the Westland Wyvern had contra-rotating propellers. The Martin-Baker MB 5 test aircraft also used this propeller type.

Later variants of the Supermarine Spitfire and Seafire used the Griffon with contra-rotating props. In the Spitfire/Seafire and Shackleton's case the primary reason for using contra-rotating propellers was to increase the propeller blade-area, and hence absorb greater engine power, within a propeller diameter limited by the height of the aircraft's undercarriage. The Short Sturgeon used two Merlin 140s with contra-rotating propellers.

The Bristol Brabazon prototype airliner used eight Bristol Centaurus engines driving four pairs of contra-rotating propellers, each engine driving a single propeller.

The post-war SARO Princess prototype flying boat airliner also had eight of its ten engines driving contra-rotating propellers.

USSR, Russia and Ukraine

In the 1950s, the Soviet Union's Kuznetsov Design Bureau developed the NK-12 turboprop. Four NK-12 engines power the Tupolev Tu-95 Bear, the only turboprop bomber to enter service, as well as one of the fastest propeller-driven aircraft. The Tu-114, an airliner derivative of the Tu-95, holds the world speed record for propeller aircraft. The Tu-95 was also the first Soviet bomber to have intercontinental range. The Tu-126 AEW aircraft and Tu-142 maritime patrol aircraft are two more NK-12 powered designs derived from the Tu-95.

The NK-12 engine powers another well-known Soviet aircraft, the Antonov An-22 Antheus, a heavy-lift cargo aircraft. At the time of its introduction, the An-22 was the largest aircraft in the world and is still by far the world's largest turboprop-powered aircraft. From the 1960s through the 1970s, it set several world records in the categories of maximum payload-to-height ratio and maximum payload lifted to altitude.

Of lesser note is the use of the NK-12 engine in the A-90 Orlyonok, a mid-size Soviet ekranoplan. The A-90 uses one NK-12 engine mounted at the top of its T-tail, along with two turbofans installed in the nose.

In the 1980s, Kuznetsov continued to develop powerful contra-rotating engines. The NK-110, which was tested in the late 1980s, had a contra-rotating propeller configuration with four blades in front and four in back, like the NK-12. Even more powerful was the NK-62, which was in development throughout most of the decade. Unlike the NK-12, however, these later engines were not adopted by any of the aircraft design bureaus.

In 1994, Antonov produced the An-70, a heavy transport aircraft. It is powered by four Progress D-27 propfan engines driving contra-rotating propellers. The characteristics of the D-27 engine and its propeller make it a propfan, a hybrid between a turbofan engine and a turboprop engine.

United States

The United States worked with several prototypes, including the Northrop XB-35, XB-42 Mixmaster, the Douglas XTB2D Skypirate, the Curtiss XBTC, the A2J Super Savage, the Boeing XF8B, the XP-56 Black Bullet, the Fisher P-75 Eagle and the tail-sitting Convair XFY "Pogo" and Lockheed XFV "Salmon" VTOL fighters and the Hughes XF-11 reconnaissance plane. The Convair R3Y Tradewind flying boat entered service with contra-rotating propellers. However, both piston-engined and turboprop-powered propeller-driven aircraft were reaching their zenith and new technological developments such as the advent of the pure turbojet and turbofan engines, both without propellers, meant that the designs were quickly eclipsed.

The US propeller manufacturer, Hamilton Standard, bought a Fairey Gannet in 1983 to study the effects of counter rotation on propeller noise and blade vibratory stresses. The Gannet was particularly suitable because the independently-driven propellers provided a comparison between counter and single rotation.

Ultralight applications
An Austrian company, Sun Flightcraft, distributes a contra-rotating gearbox for use on Rotax 503 and 582 engines on ultralight and microlight aircraft. The Coax-P was developed by Hans Neudorfer of NeuraJet and allows powered hang-gliders and parachutes to develop 15 to 20 percent more power while reducing torque moments. The manufacturer also reports reduced noise levels from dual contra-rotating props using the Coax-P gearbox.

Use in water 

Torpedoes such as the Bliss-Leavitt torpedo have commonly used contra-rotating propellers to give the maximum possible speed within a limited diameter as well as counteracting the torque that would otherwise tend to cause the torpedo to rotate around its own longitudinal axis.

Recreational Boating: in 1982 Volvo Penta introduced a contra-rotating boat propeller branded DuoProp. The patented device has been marketed since.
After the Volvo Penta patents ran out, Mercury has also produced a corresponding product, MerCruiser Bravo 3.

Commercial ships: In traditional machinery arrangement contra-rotating propellers are rare, due to cost and complexity.

In 2004 ABB produced a product for large-power installations: the forward propeller is on a traditional shaftline, while the aft propeller is in an ABB Azipod.

At lower power levels, contra-rotating mechanical azimuth thrusters are one possibility, convenient for CRP due to their inherent bevel gear construction.  Rolls-Royce and Steerprop have offered CRP versions of their products.

See also 
 Coaxial rotors
 Contra-rotating
 Marine propulsion

References

External links

 
 
Luftfahrtmuseum.com – Further information and pictures of contra rotators for the Fairey Gannet and Shackleton
 
 A History of Aircraft Using Contra-Rotating Propellers (Part 1) – Aircraft Engine Historical Society
 A History of Aircraft Using Contra-Rotating Propellers (Part 2) – Aircraft Engine Historical Society
 A History of Aircraft Using Contra-Rotating Propellers (Part 3) – Aircraft Engine Historical Society
 A History of Aircraft Using Contra-Rotating Propellers (Part 4) – Aircraft Engine Historical Society

Aircraft engines
Aircraft configurations
Propellers